Gheorghe Butoiu (born 7 November 1968 in Dragoslavele, Argeș County) is a Romanian retired football player and current manager. From April 2013, he is assistant coach of Liga II team Săgeata Năvodari.

External links

1968 births
Living people
People from Argeș County
Romanian footballers
Association football midfielders
FCV Farul Constanța players
FC Rapid București players
FC Progresul București players
Standard Liège players
Belgian Pro League players
Romanian expatriate footballers
Expatriate footballers in Belgium
Romanian expatriate sportspeople in Belgium
Romanian football managers
FCV Farul Constanța managers